Sugarloaf Shores is an unincorporated community in Monroe County, Florida, United States, located in the lower Florida Keys on Lower Sugarloaf Key near mile marker 17 on US 1 (the Overseas Highway).

It is directly across US 1 from the ghost town of Perky.

Geography

References

External links
History of Sugarloaf Key

Unincorporated communities in Monroe County, Florida
Unincorporated communities in Florida
Populated coastal places in Florida on the Atlantic Ocean